Season One may refer to:

Albums 
 Season One (Suburban Legends album), 2004
 Season One (All Sons & Daughters album), 2012
 Season One (Saukrates album), 2012

See also 
 
 
 Season 2 (disambiguation)
 Season 4 (disambiguation)